Woh Jo Hasina is a 1983 Indian Hindi-language film directed by Deepak Bahry, starring Mithun Chakraborty, Ranjeeta Kaur, Pran, Kader Khan, Prema Narayan, Rajendranath, Satyen Kappoo, Madan Puri and Chander.

Cast
Mithun Chakraborty
Ranjeeta Kaur
Pran
Kader Khan
Prema Narayan
Rajendranath
Satyen Kappoo
Madan Puri
Chander

Songs
"Rabba Mujhe Kya Ho Gaya" - Lata Mangeshkar
"Zora Zori" - Asha Bhosle, Amit Kumar
"Lag Ja Gale Se Ae Tanhaai" - Usha Mangeshkar, Nitin Mukesh
"Dulhan Banoongi Doli Chadoongi" - Lata Mangeshkar, Manna Dey
"Chand Chal Tu Zara Dheeme Dheeme" (Happy) - Kishore Kumar
"Chand Chal Tu Zara Dheeme Dheeme" (Sad) - Kishore Kumar
"Kab Ke Bichhde" - Asha Bhosle

References
http://www.imdb.com/title/tt0387692/
http://www.ibosnetwork.com/asp/filmbodetails.asp?id=Woh+Jo+Hasina

External links
 

1983 films
1980s Hindi-language films
Indian action films
Films scored by Raamlaxman
1983 action films
Hindi-language action films
Films directed by Deepak Bahry